Frances Baard (previously Diamantveld) is one of the 5 districts of Northern Cape province of South Africa. The seat of Frances Baard is Kimberley. The majority of its 324 814  people speak Setswana (2001 Census). The district code is DC9.

Previously known as Diamantveld District Municipality, it was renamed in honour of Frances Baard in June 2001. On 9 August 2009 a statue of Frances Baard was unveiled by Northern Cape Premier Hazel Jenkins.

Geography

Neighbours
Frances Baard is surrounded by:
 Dr Ruth Segomotsi Mompati (DC39) in the north
 John Taolo Gaetsewe (DC45) in the north west
 Lejweleputswa (DC18) in the east
 Pixley ka Seme (DC7) in the south
 Xhariep (DC16) in the south-west
 ZF Mgcawu (DC8) in the west

Local municipalities
The district contains the following local municipalities:

Demographics
The following statistics are from the 2001 census.

Gender

Ethnic group

Age

Politics

Election results
Election results for Frances Baard in the South African general election, 2004. 
 Population 18 and over: 206 209 [63.49% of total population]
 Total votes: 129 954 [40.01% of total population]
 Voting % estimate: 63.02% votes as a % of population 18 and over

References

External links
 Frances Baard District Municipality District

District municipalities of the Northern Cape
Frances Baard District Municipality